Chief Earth Woman was a nineteenth-century Ojibwa woman and a significant figure in Ojibwa history. She claimed that she had gained supernatural powers from a dream, and for this reason, accompanied the men on the warpath. While some Ojibwa warrior women responded to necessity, Chief Earth Woman chose to become a warrior, entering battle with the Sioux. Her dreams provided her fellow Ojibwa warriors with protection, and guided them through the battle. She confided with the leader that her dreams predicted the movements of the Sioux, aiding the Ojibwa in battle. In the battle, she succeeded in scalping an enemy, earning her traditional honors. Ruth Landes' research in the 1930s described Chief Earth Woman as one of few women to command a war party and receive the honors of a man, and later research by Colleen Sheryl McIvor places Chief Earth Woman within the tradition of the Anishinaabe Ogichidaakwe, or woman warrior.

She was born around 1878 near Waterloo, Ohio as Birtha Snyder, Snider or Snidow. She married a man named "White Owl" in 1893, and she frequently traveled from Ohio to Michigan. She lived in a place called "Old Man's Cave" while in Ohio.

Chief Earth Woman's story is often associated as a parallel to those stories of Lozen and Running Eagle.

References

Further reading
 Smith, Theresa S. (Spring 1999.) ""Yes, I'm Brave": Extraordinary Women in the Anishnaabe (Ojibwe) Tradition." Journal of Feminist Studies in Religion: 15(1).

Native American women in warfare
Ojibwe people
Women in 19th-century warfare
19th-century Native American women